The Royal Parks Operational Command Unit is a unit of the Metropolitan Police which has responsibility for policing the Royal Parks found in central London.

Spread across the five boroughs in which the various Parks are located, the pan-London service given by the Royal Parks Operational Command Unit is in addition to that provided by local borough police.  The unit is currently commanded by a Superintendent.

The OCU began to take over policing responsibility for the parks in April 2004 during a period of transfer of functions from the  Royal Parks Constabulary (RPC).  The RPC was finally abolished as a constabulary in 2006.

The OCU is responsible for policing Abingdon Street Garden; the Barge Walk Hampton Court; Brompton Cemetery; Bushy Park; the Longford River, and those parts of its banks which are for the time being under the control of the Department for Digital, Culture, Media and Sport; Greenwich Park; Grosvenor Square Gardens; Hyde Park; Kensington Gardens; Primrose Hill; Regent's Park; Richmond Park; St. James's Park; Green Park; Victoria Tower Gardens.

References

Metropolitan Police units